This is a list of species in Sargus, a genus of soldier flies in the family Stratiomyidae.

Sargus species

Sargus albibarbus Loew, 1855
Sargus albopilosus Meijere, 1906
Sargus alchidas Walker, 1849
Sargus analis (Williston, 1888)
Sargus atrobasis (James, 1941)
Sargus aureopilosus McFadden, 1982
Sargus aurora (Lindner, 1935)
Sargus baculventerus Yang & Chen, 1993
Sargus bagosas Walker, 1849
Sargus beppui Nagatomi, 1990
Sargus bipunctatus (Scopoli, 1763)
Sargus brasiliensis Wiedemann, 1830
Sargus brevis Yang, Zhang & Li, 2014
Sargus caeruleapex McFadden, 1982
Sargus chrysis Loew, 1855
Sargus circumcinctus (James, 1941)
Sargus cirrhosus McFadden, 1982
Sargus citrinellus (Lindner, 1949)
Sargus clavatus Walker, 1854
Sargus claviventris Rondani, 1850
Sargus concisus Walker, 1861
Sargus congoense (Lindner, 1965)
Sargus contractus Walker, 1854
Sargus cuprarius (Linnaeus, 1758)
Sargus cyaneus (Brunetti, 1912)
Sargus darius Hardy, 1932
Sargus decorus Say, 1824
Sargus elegans Loew, 1866
Sargus elongatulus McFadden, 1982
Sargus evansi McFadden, 1982
Sargus fasciatus Fabricius, 1805
Sargus festivus Jaennicke, 1867
Sargus flavilatus James, 1973
Sargus flavipes (Lindner, 1966)
Sargus flavipes Meigen, 1822
Sargus flavopilosus (Bigot, 1879)
Sargus gemmifer Walker, 1849
Sargus goliath (Curran, 1927)
Sargus grandis (Ôuchi, 1938)
Sargus gselli Hill, 1919
Sargus huangshanensis Yang, Yu & Yang, 2012
Sargus illuminata (Lindner, 1949)
Sargus inactus Walker, 1859
Sargus inficitus Walker, 1861
Sargus iridatus (Scopoli, 1763)
Sargus isthmi James, 1982
Sargus jaennickei Woodley, 2001
Sargus jamesi (Lindner, 1966)
Sargus jucundus Walker, 1850
Sargus laetus Wulp, 1885
Sargus lateralis Macquart, 1834
Sargus lateropictus James, 1982
Sargus latifrons Yang, Zhang & Li, 2014
Sargus latipennis (Brunetti, 1923)
Sargus latus Bellardi, 1859
Sargus lii Chen, Liang & Yang, 2010
Sargus limbatus Macquart, 1838
Sargus linearis Walker, 1854
Sargus lucidus (Lindner, 1949)
Sargus luctuosus (Lindner, 1938)
Sargus macquartii Perty, 1833
Sargus mactans Walker, 1859
Sargus maculatus (Lindner, 1936)
Sargus mandarinus Schiner, 1868
Sargus melleus Rondani, 1848
Sargus meracus Nagatomi, 1975
Sargus meridionalis White, 1916
Sargus metallinus Fabricius, 1805
Sargus molliculus (Nagatomi, 1975)
Sargus multicolor (Lindner, 1949)
Sargus nigricoxa Yang, Zhang & Li, 2014
Sargus nigrifacies Yang, Zhang & Li, 2014
Sargus nigripes (Lindner, 1955)
Sargus niphonensis Bigot, 1879
Sargus opulentum (Grünberg, 1915)
Sargus opulentus Walker, 1854
Sargus pallidiventris (Brunetti, 1926)
Sargus parastenus James, 1982
Sargus pavo (Lindner, 1965)
Sargus persimilis McFadden, 1982
Sargus petersoni McFadden, 1982
Sargus pleuriticus Loew, 1866
Sargus polychromus James, 1982
Sargus pseudoptecticus James, 1982
Sargus ptecticoides (Lindner, 1935)
Sargus ptecticoideum (Lindner, 1966)
Sargus pubescens Wulp, 1885
Sargus punctatus McFadden, 1982
Sargus purpuratus Lindner, 1972
Sargus purpureus (Walker, 1860)
Sargus rufibasis (Bigot, 1879)
Sargus ruficornis Macquart, 1846
Sargus rufifrons (Pleske, 1926)
Sargus rufipes Wahlberg, 1854
Sargus rufitarsis (Macquart, 1846)
Sargus schaeuffelei Lindner, 1972
Sargus seychellensis Kertész, 1972
Sargus sichuanensis Yang, Zhang & Li, 2014
Sargus speciosus Macquart, 1846
Sargus splendidus Brunetti, 1925
Sargus stenus James, 1982
Sargus stuckenbergi (Lindner, 1961)
Sargus tenuis (Lindner, 1938)
Sargus tenuiventris (Bigot, 1879)
Sargus thoracicus Macquart, 1834
Sargus transversus McFadden, 1982
Sargus tricolor Yang, Zhang & Li, 2014
Sargus tuberculatus Loew, 1855
Sargus vandykei James, 1941
Sargus vetus Cockerell, 1921
Sargus viridiceps Macquart, 1855
Sargus viridis Say, 1823
Sargus viridistima (Brunetti, 1926)
Sargus yerbabuena Woodley, 2001

References

Sargus
Diptera of North America
Diptera of South America
Diptera of Europe
Diptera of Asia
Diptera of Africa
Diptera of Australasia